Rose Camile LeDieu Mooney-Slater (23 October 1902 — 21 November 1981) was a professor of physics at the Newcomb College of the Tulane University and the first female X-ray crystallographer in the United States.

Life 
Rose Camille LeDieu was raised in New Orleans, Louisiana.
Mooney-Slater received a B.S. and M.S. in physics from the Newcomb College of the Tulane University in 1926 and 1929, respectively. In 1932, she received a Ph.D. in physics from the University of Chicago. In 1933, she became a professor of physics at the Newcomb College. She became a Guggenheim Fellow in 1939. In 1941, she was appointed the head of the Physics Department at Newcomb College. From 1943 to 1944, she worked as a research physicist and crystallographer on the Manhattan Project in the Metallurgical Lab at the University of Chicago. From 1952 to 1956, she worked as a physicist at the National Bureau of Standards. From 1956 to 1981, she served as a research physicist at MIT. From 1966 to 1974, she taught physics at the University of Florida. She was married to John C. Slater. Mooney-Slater died on 21 November 1981.

Awards 
She was a Guggenheim Fellow and a Fellow of the American Physical Society.

References 

American women physicists
1902 births
1981 deaths
Fellows of the American Physical Society
20th-century American physicists
Tulane University faculty
Tulane University alumni
University of Chicago alumni
University of Florida faculty
Massachusetts Institute of Technology staff
Manhattan Project people
Scientists from New Orleans
American women academics
20th-century American women scientists